Queen of the Sun: What Are the Bees Telling Us? is a 2010 documentary film directed by Taggart Siegel. The film investigates multiple angles of the recent bee epidemic colony collapse disorder.  It also explores the historical and contemporary relationship between bees and humans. Featuring interviews from Michael Pollan, Gunther Hauk, Vandana Shiva, Hugh Wilson, Michael Thiele (former bee keeper at Green Gulch Farm), May Berenbaum, Carlo Petrini and Raj Patel.

Awards
The film was an official selection of the 2010 International Documentary Film Festival Amsterdam for the Green Screen Competition. It received the Documentary Audience Award from both the Maui Film Festival and Indie Memphis Film Festival. It was 2010 Pare Lorentz Honorable Mention for the International Documentary Association.

References

External links
 
 

2010 films
2010 documentary films
American documentary films
Documentary films about bees
Documentary films about environmental issues
Films directed by Taggart Siegel
2010s English-language films
2010s American films